Pibulsongkram Rajabhat Stadium is a multi-purpose stadium in Phitsanulok Province, Thailand. It is currently used mostly for football matches and is the home stadium of Phitsanulok. The stadium holds 3,000 people.

Multi-purpose stadiums in Thailand